The 1992–93 UEFA Champions League second round was the second stage of the competition proper of the 1992–93 UEFA Champions League, and featured the 16 winners from the first round. It began on 21 October with the first legs and ended on 4 November 1992 with the second legs. The eight winners advanced to the group stage.

Times are CET (UTC+1), as listed by UEFA.

Format
Each tie was played over two legs, with each team playing one leg at home. The team that scored more goals on aggregate over the two legs advanced to the next round. If the aggregate score was level, the away goals rule was applied, i.e. the team that scored more goals away from home over the two legs advanced. If away goals were also equal, then extra time was played. The away goals rule would be again applied after extra time, i.e. if there were goals scored during extra time and the aggregate score was still level, the visiting team advanced by virtue of more away goals scored. If no goals were scored during extra time, the tie was decided by penalty shoot-out.

Draw
The draw for the second round was held on 2 October 1992 in Geneva, Switzerland.

Summary

The first legs were played on 21 October, and the second legs on 4 November 1992.

|}

Matches

IFK Göteborg won 4–0 on aggregate.

Rangers won 4–2 on aggregate.

Milan won 5–0 on aggregate.

Marseille won 2–0 on aggregate.

3–3 on aggregate. Club Brugge won on away goals.

Porto won 6–2 on aggregate.

PSV Eindhoven won 3–1 on aggregate.

CSKA Moscow won 4–3 on aggregate.

References

External links

Second round
October 1992 sports events in Europe
November 1992 sports events in Europe